Lipinia nitens is a species of skink found in Malaysia.

References

Lipinia
Reptiles described in 1871
Taxa named by Wilhelm Peters